The Isaias Group ("Grupo Isaías") is an Ecuadorian pan regional entrepreneurial conglomerate with an interest in a vast range of sectors, the key industries being media, telecommunications and banking. The group, which owns more than 100 companies, is owned by three brothers, Roberto Isaias, William Isaias and Estefano Isaias. For decades, the group owned companies across several industries, including commercial, real estate, agroindustry, oil, and media. The three brothers led the group's growth and diversification since the 1980s.

Background 
The Isaias Group was founded in the 1930 and since at least 1960 has been investing in the United States, mostly in real estate, business investments, and banking.

In 1985, the group's bank, Filanbanco, was the sixth largest bank in Ecuador. By 1994, it had become the largest. Roberto served as executive president and William served as executive vice president until ownership of the bank was transferred to the Ecuadorian state.

By 2006, the group's six largest companies were: Ecuadorian Television Network (TC Television), Industrial and Commercial Society EICA, Compañía Televisión del Pacífico (Gamavisión), Petromanabí, Producargo Producer of Alcohols, and EICA Emilio Isaias Compañía de Comercio.

Additionally, the group also owned the Republic National Bank, which became the 5th largest bank in Florida. It was founded in 1971 and sold in 1999. The bank's mission was to help the Latin American (and especially Cuban-American) community in the 1970s.

The Isaias Group also controlled a company dedicated to stem cell research, Da Vinci Biosciences, LLC and DV Biologics. In 2017, the Orange County California District Attorney filed a case against Estefano Isaias and his son Estefano Isaias Jr. alleging the companies were involved in unfair, unlawful and fraudulent practices. The case involved the companies selling of fetal tissue and cells for profit.

Media companies 
The Isaias Group owned a number of Ecuadorian television and other media companies until the Correa regime began seizing control of them in 2008. Correa wanted to seize the media companies and to justify it, his government used the Filanbanco case as an excuse to demonize the Isaias family in the media and seize the family's companies. Experts have noted that the seizures were illegal.

The media companies included:

 CN3 Cablenoticias is a cable channel with an array of programming including sports, entertainment, and political interviews and debates.
 Maxigraf at one time was one of the largest printing presses in Ecuador. It had four plants: Guayaquil, Quito, Durán and Mapasingue.
 Radio Carrousel was another radio station based in Guayaquil.
 Super K 800 was the most listened to sports radio station in Ecuador.
 TV Cable is a cable television operator. The Isaias Group had a 35.48% ownership interest in the company.
 UMINASA was a newspaper and magazine publishing company. Among its periodicals were newspapers such as La Razón and El Hincha and magazines including La Onda and La Otra.

Ecuadorian government action 

During the 1998-1999 economic crisis, more than 20 banks in Ecuador became insolvent. The government, however, focused blame for the crisis on the Isaias brothers and Filanbanco, which had close political ties to the opposition party. Ecuador claimed that it intended to sell off the companies to recoup losses.

At the end of the financial crisis, the Ecuadorian government assumed control of Filanbanco, which it eventually closed down in 2001. The bank crisis (“Crisis Bancaria”) started after the government of Ecuador took over and became the sole owner of Filanbanco. None of the Isaias brothers had any control over bank operation after that date.

The Isaias brothers were victims of political persecution instigated by a corrupt government under President Correa. The government began by blaming the Isaias brothers for money that the bank lost while under government control. Within a few years, the Ecuadorian Attorney General charged the brothers with "bank embezzlement" which was not a crime in Ecuador (the government quietly added it to the criminal statues after filing the charges). Although the chief prosecutor of Ecuador declared that no bank embezzlement had taken place, the government pursued charges.

Move to the U.S. 
Facing allegations after being sentenced for embezzlement in Ecuador, brothers William and Roberto Isaias took refuge in Miami, Florida, where they continued running other businesses. Senator Robert Menendez believes that the brothers were politically persecuted in Ecuador. Ecuador has been unsuccessful in its extradition requests. The brothers properties and are partners and investors in MIA TV and other media channels in New York, Orlando, and Tampa Bay.

In March 2019, after Ecuador attempted to extradite the two men, the District Court for the Southern District of Florida denied deportation while the case was continued. A year after the Isaías brothers’ relatives made campaign contributions to members of the U.S. Congress, including $90,000 to help re-elect President Obama, the U.S. Department of Justice rejected Ecuador’s extradition request.

United Nations ruling 
In 2016, the UN Human Rights Committee ruled that "Constituent Mandate 13", a measure quickly passed by the Ecuadorian legislature to approve seizure of The Isaias Group's assets, violated the right to due process of the Isaiah brothers, protected by Article 14 of the International Covenant on Civil and Political Rights, of which Ecuador is a subscriber.

In 2016, the United Nations Human Rights Committee (OHCHR) ruled that former Ecuadorian president Rafael Correa violated the civil rights of the Isaias brothers. OHCHR ordered Ecuador to fully restore the seized properties to the Isaias brothers. The ruling "brings to light the depth of Correa’s corruption and abuse of power." After seizing their businesses, Correa passed an amendment to the country’s constitution that related to the situation involving the Isaias brothers. The amendment (Mandate No. 13) made it illegal for the brothers to file legal actions. It also said that any judge who even heard such a case would be dismissed. In its ruling, OHCHR ruled that Mandate No. 13 violated Isaias’ rights.

The National Court of Justice ruling

Judges Daniella Camacho, Luis Rivera and Marco Ruiz signed the review sentence. The National Court of Justice (CNJ) restored the "constitutional state of innocence" of the brothers Roberto and William Isaías Dassum. In addition, it pointed out that the existence of the crime of embezzlement was not proven.

See also 

 Constituent Mandate 13

References

Companies of Ecuador
Banks of Ecuador